Delphinbrunnen is located in Maxvorstadt, Munich, Bavaria, Germany.

Buildings and structures in Munich
Maxvorstadt